Nadine Debois (born 25 September 1961 in Paris) is a French athlete, specialising in the  400 meters and the Combined Events. World Record holder as fastest 800m ever run in a heptathlon.

Biography  
Nadine was the first holder of the French record in the heptathlon in 1981 with 5,537 points.  She improved this record in 1986 with 6,333 points.

In 1987, she took seventh in 4 × 400 m Relay during the World Championships in Rome.  She got the same result at the  1988 Olympics in Seoul.

She won multiple French championship titles:  two outdoors in the Long jump and the heptathlon, and three in the Indoor  400 meters and  pentathlon.

Prize list  
 French Championships in Athletics   :  
 winner of the long jump 1985   
 winner of the heptathlon 1987   
 Athletics Indoor Championships of France   :  
 winner of 400 m 1986   
 winner of the pentathlon 1986 and 1987

Records

References  

Olympic profile Nadine Debois on sports-reference.com

1961 births
Living people
French heptathletes
French female sprinters
Athletes (track and field) at the 1988 Summer Olympics
Olympic athletes of France
Athletes from Paris
Olympic female sprinters